Ryanodine receptor 2 (RYR2) is one of a class of ryanodine receptors and a protein found primarily in cardiac muscle. In humans, it is encoded by the RYR2 gene. In the process of cardiac calcium-induced calcium release, RYR2 is the major mediator for sarcoplasmic release of stored calcium ions.

Structure 

The channel is composed of RYR2 homotetramers and FK506-binding proteins found in a 1:4 stoichiometric ratio. Calcium channel function is affected by the specific type of FK506 isomer interacting with the RYR2 protein, due to binding differences and other factors.

Function 

The RYR2 protein functions as the major component of a calcium channel located in the sarcoplasmic reticulum that supplies ions to the cardiac muscle during systole. To enable cardiac muscle contraction, calcium influx through voltage-gated L-type calcium channels in the plasma membrane allows calcium ions to bind to RYR2 located on the sarcoplasmic reticulum. This binding causes the release of calcium through RYR2 from the sarcoplasmic reticulum into the cytosol, where it binds to the C domain of troponin, which shifts tropomyosin and allows the myosin ATPase to bind to actin, enabling cardiac muscle contraction. RYR2 channels are associated with many cellular functions, including mitochondrial metabolism, gene expression and cell survival, in addition to their role in cardiomyocyte contraction.

Clinical significance 

Deleterious mutations of the ryanodine receptor family, and especially the RYR2 receptor, lead to a constellation of pathologies leading to both acute and chronic heart failure collectively known as "Ryanopathies."

Mutations in the RYR2 gene are associated with catecholaminergic polymorphic ventricular tachycardia and arrhythmogenic right ventricular dysplasia.

Recently, sudden cardiac death in several young individuals in the Amish community (four of which were from the same family) was traced to homozygous duplication of a mutant RyR2 gene. Normal (wild type) RyR2 functions primarily in the myocardium (heart muscle).

Mice with genetically reduced RYR2 exhibit a lower basal heart rate and fatal arrhythmias.

Interactions 

Ryanodine receptor 2 has been shown to interact with:

 AKAP6,
 PRKACA,
 PRKACB,
 PRKACG, and
 SRI.

See also 
Ryanodine receptor

References

Further reading

External links 
  GeneReviews/NCBI/NIH/UW entry on Catecholaminergic Polymorphic Ventricular Tachycardia
  GeneReviews/NCBI/NIH/UW entry on Arrhythmogenic Right Ventricular Dysplasia/Cardiomyopathy, Autosomal Dominant
  OMIM entries on Arrhythmogenic Right Ventricular Dysplasia/Cardiomyopathy, Autosomal Dominant
 

Ion channels
EF-hand-containing proteins